Lena C. Taylor (born July 25, 1966) is an American politician and attorney serving as a member of the Wisconsin Senate from the 4th district. She previously served in the Wisconsin Assembly, representing the 18th district from 2003 to 2005.

Taylor previously ran unsuccessfully for Milwaukee County executive in 2008 and mayor of Milwaukee in 2020.

Early life and education 
Taylor, a lifelong resident of Milwaukee, Wisconsin, is a 1984 graduate of Rufus King High School. She earned a Bachelor of Arts degree in English from the University of Wisconsin–Milwaukee in 1990, and a Juris Doctor from Southern Illinois University School of Law in 1993. As an undergraduate, she joined Alpha Kappa Alpha sorority.

Career 
After graduating from law school, Taylor worked as a public defender for more than two years, representing indigent citizens in need of legal services. In 1996, she opened Taylor and Associates Law Office, a general practice firm on the north side of Milwaukee.

Wisconsin legislature
Taylor was elected to the Wisconsin State Assembly in a special election in April 2003 and was subsequently elected to the Wisconsin State Senate in 2004. When Democrats were elected to the majority in the Senate in November 2006, Taylor was chosen to chair the Committee on Judiciary and Corrections, on which she had served for the preceding two years. In January 2007, Taylor was selected by the majority leader to serve on the Joint Committee on Finance for the second time. Following the recall of Van H. Wanggaard in June 2012, and the return of Democrats to majority party control, Taylor was named co-chair of the Joint Committee on Finance.

In past sessions, Taylor served on the Joint Committee on Finance, and as the chair the Senate Judiciary Committee, expanding the committee's work on criminal justice reforms and implemented the first ever "State of Justice" tour with the committee across Wisconsin.

2011 Wisconsin protests

During the protests in Wisconsin, Taylor, along with the 13 other Democratic state senators, left the state to deny the State Senate a quorum on Governor Scott Walker's "Budget Repair" legislation which repealed collective bargaining on benefits for public employees. Taylor was a frequent guest on progressive political talk shows, appearing several times on The Ed Show.

During the course of debate in the Joint Committee on Finance and elsewhere, Taylor made statements comparing Walker's proposed legislation to Adolf Hitler's plan to eliminate unions. On her Twitter account she wrote "LIKE HITLER in 1933, WALKER is busting unions."

As a result of her stance on the issue, Taylor (along with seven other Democratic senators) was subject to a recall attempt. However, her opponents were only able to obtain two signatures for her recall, as of April 7. Experts said that since Taylor is in a strongly partisan senate district, she was unlikely to be defeated in a recall election, and no recall petitions were filed.

Campaigns for other offices

2008 Milwaukee County Executive election
In 2008, Taylor challenged incumbent Milwaukee County Executive Scott Walker. She was defeated 57.74% to 40.40% by Walker.

2020 Milwaukee mayoral election

Taylor ran for mayor of Milwaukee in 2020. After the February 18 primary, she and incumbent mayor Tom Barrett both advanced to the April 7 general election. She was defeated in the general election by Barrett.

2022 lieutenant governor election 

Taylor briefly ran for Lieutenant Governor of Wisconsin, announcing her candidacy in October 2021.  She ended her campaign two months later, on December 25, 2021.

2022 Milwaukee mayoral election 

Taylor ran for mayor of Milwaukee in the 2022 special election. She placed third in the primary election, failing to proceed to the general ballot.

References

External links

 Profile at the Wisconsin Senate
 Campaign website for Mayor of Milwaukee
Senator Lena Taylor at the Wisconsin State Legislature
constituency site
 
4th Senate District, Senator Taylor in the Wisconsin Blue Book (2005–2006)
Campaign 2008 campaign contributions at Wisconsin Democracy Campaign

|-

1966 births
20th-century African-American people
20th-century African-American women
21st-century African-American politicians
21st-century African-American women
21st-century American politicians
21st-century American women politicians
African-American state legislators in Wisconsin
African-American women in politics
Living people
Democratic Party members of the Wisconsin State Assembly
Politicians from Milwaukee
Public defenders
Rufus King International High School alumni
University of Wisconsin–Milwaukee alumni
Democratic Party Wisconsin state senators
Women state legislators in Wisconsin